Working for the Man is a compilation album by British band Tindersticks. It was released on Island Records in April 2004 in the UK, and on Island's parent company Universal in November 2004 in the U.S. The album covers the period from the band's first single in 1992 to 1999, when Tindersticks' contract with Island ended after the release of their fourth studio album Simple Pleasure. Working for the Man was released ahead of the reissue by Island of the group's first five albums in remastered and expanded versions.

The album's artwork is by artist Suzanne Osborne and the band's singer Stuart Staples.

Track listing
All songs written and composed by Tindersticks, except where indicated.
"City Sickness" – 3:58
"Marbles" – 4:31
"Patchwork" – 4:41
"Her" (original version) – 2:52
"Travelling Light" – 4:40
"Tiny Tears" – 5:26
"Bathtime" – 3:56
"Another Night In" – 4:58
"Can We Start Again?" – 3:49
"I Know That Loving" – 5:45
"For Those..." (orchestral version) – 4:55

Bonus CD
Initial versions of the album came with a second bonus disc of hard to find or deleted tracks.

References

Tindersticks albums
2004 compilation albums